The French National Baseball team represents the French Federation of Baseball and Softball in international competitions, such as the World Baseball Classic, the European Baseball Championship, and the World Cup of Baseball.  They are currently ranked 25th in the world.

Roster

History
The history of the French team began in 1929 with their first official game against Spain in Barcelona with a 10–6 victory. The team made its debut in competition in 1955 when it played in the finals of the second European Baseball Championship, finishing fifth out of five teams.

The French team has qualified for the World Cup finals three times, the first time in 1994. In order to qualify for the finals a playoff game was played against South Africa. France lost seven games during the competition, and finished in 16th place out of 16 teams. In 2001, as well as 2003, les Bleus (the nickname of the team) made their way into the World Cup finals. During the 2001 edition the French team finished in 15th place, tied for last with the Philippines. They also finished in 15th place in 2003, out of 15 teams.

In the fall of 2012, France participated in their first World Baseball Classic Qualifier. The team played in the Jupiter, Florida, pool alongside South Africa, Spain, and Israel. France lost both its games to Spain and South Africa. 
 
In September 2013, France named former MLB pitcher Éric Gagné new head coach.  The team played a series of trial games in Florida in October 2013 and in Phoenix, Arizona, in March 2014 in preparation for the 2014 European Championships.  In early September 2014, France hosted the inaugural France International Baseball Tournament.  France won the first exhibition game 8-7 vs. Japan before claiming game 1 6-3 over Belgium and game 2 10-5, again over Japan.  "Les Bleus" claimed their first-ever victory over the Netherlands with a 12-8 win on September 8, 2014, before falling 3-2 against the Dutch in the championship game the following night.

Every two years, France participates in the European Baseball Championship. France's best result came in 1999 when the team finished third. The French National team finished 6th in the 2014 European Championships, going 4-1 in Regensburg, GER before falling to Czech Republic, Holland and Spain in the Brno, CZ.

In March 2015 French pitcher Owen Ozanich was France's lone representative on Team Europe, which split two contests at the Tokyo Dome against Samurai Japan.

In July 2015 France sent many of its national team players to participate in the 2015 World University Summer Games in South Korea.  Rouen manager Keino Perez was the manager for this competition. France finished in 8th place. Once back in Europe, the national team played a series of games in Antwerp, Belgium, July 23–24 against Sweden and the host country, Belgium. With a 2-0 record, France won the Flanders invitational tournament with Belgium coming in second and Sweden third.

In November and December 2015 Ozanich along with Leonel Cespedes represented France on Team Europe during the Asian Winter League held in Taichung, Taiwan. Cespedes had a 4.50 ERA out of the bullpen. Ozanich led the team in innings pitched, strikeouts, and ERA.

The French National Team competed in the 2016 World Baseball Classic Qualifiers held in March 2016 in Panama. In game one, Panama beat France behind long-time MLB catcher Carlos Ruiz's two home runs in front of a crowd of over 11,000. In game two, Cespedes pitched France to a victory over European rival Spain at Rod Carew Stadium. The 5-3 victory marked the first win in four tries at the WBC Qualifiers for the French. In the semi-final game, France, led by offensively by first baseman Rene Leveret's home run in the fifth inning, found themselves tied with Panama in the fifth inning, but were not able to close out the game, falling 7-4, ending their hopes of qualifying for the 2017 WBC.

In April 2016 Kieran Mattison replaced Eric Gagne as French National Team Manager. On July 16, 2016 the FFBS hosted its first-ever All-Star Game in La Rochelle, won by the French League Foreign All-Stars by a score of 12-7 over the French National Team. Prior to the game, French national team shortstop Felix Brown won the first annual home run derby.

In September 2016, the French Federation hosted the second edition of the France International Baseball Tournament (also known as the Yoshida Challenge), featuring France, Germany, Netherlands, and International Stars. France finished in third place behind Germany and the Netherlands. France finished in 7th place in the 2016 European Championships which were held in Hoofddorp, NL. They beat Croatia, Greece, and Sweden, while falling to Italy, Belgium, and Spain. Third baseman Maxime Lefevre hit .500 for the tournament while P/OF Leonel Cespedes posted a 2-0 record with a 0.64 ERA.

French pitchers Owen Ozanich and Marc-Andre Habeck represented France at the 2016 Asian Winter League with Team Europe.

In July 2017 French/Cuban 1B/OF Ernesto Martinez Jr. signed with the Milwaukee Brewers for $880,000, the largest-ever bonus for a French player. The big lefty served as France's designated hitter at just 16 years old in the 2016 WBC Qualifier where he played alongside his father, Ernesto Martinez Sr. a longtime star in the French D1 for Senart. Through the 2021 MiLB season, Martinez, now 22, has hit .254/.364/.417 with 20 HR, 100 RBI and 41 SB.

In July 2017 the French national team again participated in the annual All-Star Game, again held in La Rochelle, falling 5-1 to the All-Star Team made up of the best foreign players.

In August 2017, the French University team participated in the Summer Universiades in Taipei, Taiwan. The team had a surprise win over the highly favored Chinese Taipei, before falling to Korea and Czech Republic. Overall the team, again coached by Keino Perez finished 7th out of 8.

In November 2018 les bleus, managed by Kieran Mattison, headed to South Africa for a 7-game series against the South African National Team where they went 2-5 in the seven contests held in Johannesburg, Durban, and Cape Town. Minor league pitcher Yoan Antonac (Phillies) made his national team debut for France. Jose Paula was named to the all series team where he took home best defensive player for the week, Maxime Lefevre led all players in stolen bases.

The 2019 French season featured a 12-team Division 1, the league previously had 8 teams in the top division prior to this expansion. In late February, the national team held spring training in Tenerife, Spain.  Five national team members played in Italy in 2019: Owen Ozanich and Marc-Andre Habeck with Parma (Serie A), Andy Paz with Bologna (Serie A) Leonel Cespedes with Redipuglia (Serie A), and Franklin de la Rosa with Grosseto (Serie B).

In September 2019 the French National Team competed in the 2019 European Championships. Maxime Lefevre led the team with a .435 average, followed by Bastien Dagneau (.429), Andy Paz (.400) and Fred Hanvi (.350). France finished in 7th place, beating Austria, Belgium and Croatia, while falling to Italy, Spain, Israel and Germany. On the mound, Marc-Andre Habeck led France in innings pitched (11.0), Leonel Cespedes logged 7.2, and Owen Ozanich 6.0. Habeck also led the staff in strikeouts (12), ahead of Ozanich (5), Yoann Vaugelade (4) and Franklin de la Rosa (4). Daniel Camou and Lilian Amoros each logged three scoreless innings to lead the staff in ERA.

The FFBS shocked the European baseball community when they announced former San Diego Padres and San Francisco Giants manager Bruce Bochy would take over as manager of the national team. The announcement came in late 2019, and confirmed rumors that the future hall of fame skipper would lead the team in the 2020 World Baseball Classic Qualifier. Due to the world wide Coronavirus outbreak in March 2020, the WBC qualifiers have been postponed to 2022.

The 2020 French Division 1 season was cancelled on May 6, 2020. French minor leaguers Yoan Antonac and Ernesto Martinez Jr. also had their minor league seasons cancelled due to covid-19. Ariel Soriano (Nettuno) and Owen Ozanich (Parma) played 2020 in Italy. Norbert Jongerius and Robyn Clara played in the Netherlands.

The 2021 French Division 1 season began in June 2021. The French Series saw Perez's Rouen Huskies beat Senart in five games to win their 16th French Title. National team outfielder Martin Vissac took home MVP honors. In early September 2021, the Montpellier Barracudas took home the Challenge de France. Rouen and Montpellier will represent France in the 2022 CEB Cup.

The French national team finished a disappointing 15th (out of 16) in the 2021 European Championships held in Turin, Italy. France lost to Great Britain, Israel, Germany, and Greece. They beat Russia and Slovakia. The team struggled under newly appointed interim manager Keino Perez, who took over for Bochy, who cancelled his trip to Europe over covid concerns. Offensively, only Andy Paz (.364) hit over .300 for a team that hit a collective .167 over 6 games. On the mound, the French did slightly better, with the 32 year-old Ozanich leading the team in innings (10.0) and strikeouts (13) while 17 year-old Mathis Nayral allowed just 1 run over 7.1 IP (1.23 ERA) while punching out 7 batters. Outfielder Jose Paula also contributed on the mound, giving up 2 ER in 5.0 IP, striking out 9.

France will now look ahead to July 2022, where they will head to Bulgaria for the 'B' pool qualifier. France needs a good finish in order to again participate in the 2023 European Championships. First, the French national team, managed by Perez, will head Prague, Czech Republic in late June for a week of exhibition games against Spain and Czevh Republic amongst other teams.

The World Baseball Classic will be back in the spring of 2023. France lost the opening round to Great Britain, and fell to the Czech Republic in Lower round 1, with the latter securing their place for the 2023 World Baseball Classic.

Results and fixtures
The following is a list of professional baseball match results currently active in the latest version of the WBSC World Rankings, as well as any future matches that have been scheduled.

Legend

2022

2021

2019

2018

Results

Baseball World Cup
 1994 : 16th 
 2001 : 15th 
 2003 : 15th

Intercontinental Cup
 1991 : 10th
 1993 : 10th
 1997 : 7th

European Baseball Championship

 1954 : did not qualify
 1955 : 5th
 1956 : did not qualify
 1957 : did not qualify
 1958 : 6th
 1960 : did not qualify
 1962 : 6th
 1964 : 5th
 1965 : did not qualify
 1967 : did not qualify
 1969 : 7th
 1971 : 9th
 1973 : 6th
 1975 : 6th
 1977 : did not qualify
 1979 : did not qualify
 1981 : did not qualify
 1983 : 6th
 1985 : did not qualify
 1987 : 4th
 1989 : 5th
 1991 : 4th
 1993 : 4th
 1995 : 5th
 1997 : 5th
 1999 :  3rd
 2001 : 4th
 2003 : 7th
 2005 : 6th
 2007 : 5th
 2010 : 6th
 2012 : 8th
 2014 : 6th
 2016 : 7th
 2019 : 7th

French players in professional baseball

French national team players who have played professional baseball:

 Rene Leveret: Minnesota Twins (RK/A), Quebec Capitales, Amarillo Thunderheads, Lincoln Saltdogs (2006–2016), Rouen Huskies 2017 
 Joris Bert: Los Angeles Dodgers (RK)(2007–2008), Rouen Huskies 2006-2015; 2020–present 
 Fred Hanvi: Minnesota Twins (RK), Gunma Diamond Pegasus, Kochi Fighting Dogs, Aigles Trois-Rivières (2008–2020) current club: Senart Templiers
 Carlos Hereaud: Milwaukee Brewers (RK), Edinburg Roadrunners (2007–2012), Rouen Huskies 2013-2014
 Anthony Cross: Quebec Capitales (2010), Montpellier Barracudas
 Maxime Lefevre: Rouen Huskies 2010-2020, Quebec Capitales (2013) current club: Rouen Huskies 
 Alex Roy: Seattle Mariners (RK) (2012–2014), Rouen Huskies 2012-2013
 Owen Ozanich: Rouen Huskies 2011-2018, Adelaide Bite (2012–2013) (Team Europe 2015-2016) Parma (ITA) (2019-2020) current club: Montpellier Barracudas
 Felix Brown: Gunma Diamond Pegasus, Hawaii Stars, Aigles Trois-Rivières (2012–2014) current club: Senart Templiers
 Andy Paz: Oakland Athletics (RK/A/AA), Gary Southshore Railcats, Bologna (ITA) (2011–2020) 
 Leo Cespedes: (Team Europe 2015), Senart Templiers, Toulouse Tigers, Rouen Huskies (2011-2018), Redipuglia (ITA) (2019) current club: Toulouse
 Jose Paula: Oakland Athletics (RK), 2016-2017, Rouen Huskies 2018: current club: Senart Templiers
 Marc-Andre Habeck: Rouen Huskies 2016-2017, (Team Europe 2016)  (ITA) (2018) Parma (ITA) (2019+2022) current club: Parma  
 Jonathan Mottay: Canberra Cavalry (2017–18) current club: 
 Ernesto Martinez: Milwaukee Brewers (2017–present) current club: Milwaukee Brewers
 Yoan Antonac: Philadelphia Phillies (2018–2022) current club: Montpellier Barracudas

References

External links 
 France Baseball-Softball Federation official Website

National baseball teams in Europe
National sports teams of France
Baseball in France